Chříč is a municipality and village in Plzeň-North District in the Plzeň Region of the Czech Republic. It has about 200 inhabitants.

Administrative parts
The village of Lhota is an administrative part of Chříč.

Notable people
Milada Šubrtová (1924–2011), operatic singer

References

Villages in Plzeň-North District